Skærbæk Municipality was a municipality in Southern Jutland.

The municipal seat was the town of Skærbæk.

The municipality included the island of Rømø, the southernmost of Denmark's part of the North Frisian Islands.

 Brøns Parish
 Døstrup Parish
 Mjolden Parish
 
 Rømø Parish
 Skærbæk Parish
 Vodder Parish

On January 1, 2007, Skærbæk Municipality ceased to exist as the result of Kommunalreformen ("The Municipality Reform" of 2007). It was merged with Bredebro, Højer, Løgumkloster, Nørre-Rangstrup, and Tønder municipalities to form the new Tønder Municipality.

Notable people 
 Jeppe Prætorius (1745 in Skærbæk – 1823) a Danish merchant and shipowner.
 Jannik Petersen Bjerrum (1851 in Skærbæk – 1920) a Danish ophthalmologist 
 Kirstine Meyer (1861 in Skærbæk – 1941) a Danish physicist
 Kenneth Fabricius (born 1981 in Skærbæk) a Danish professional footballer.

References 

 Municipal statistics: NetBorger Kommunefakta, delivered from KMD aka Kommunedata (Municipal Data)
 Municipal mergers and neighbors: Eniro new municipalities map

External links 
 

Former municipalities of Denmark
Tønder Municipality